Georgios Vikhos (11 January 1915 – 19 April 1990) was a Greek sports shooter. He competed at the 1936 Summer Olympics and 1948 Summer Olympics.

References

1915 births
1990 deaths
Greek male sport shooters
Olympic shooters of Greece
Panathinaikos shooters
Shooters at the 1936 Summer Olympics
Shooters at the 1948 Summer Olympics
Sportspeople from Athens
20th-century Greek people